Zamse Senior High Technical School is a second-cycle co-educational institution located in Bolgatanga in the Upper East Region of Ghana.

History 
The school was formally established in 1976 as a junior high school located in Bukere. However, on the 10th of October, 1979 it was changed to a technical senior high school and relocated to Bolgatanga.

Headmasters 

 Francis Banbogo

See also

 Education in Ghana
 List of senior high schools in Ghana

References 

High schools in Ghana
Educational institutions established in 1976